Paul Emile Rustom (born 26 January 1983) is a Lebanese football coach and former player who is assistant coach of  club Sagesse. He is the son of Emile Rustom, a football manager and former player.

Club career 
Rustom began his career at Sagesse, before moving to Ansar on 23 August 2007. After finishing runner-up in the Lebanese Premier League and the Lebanese Elite Cup, he signed for Nejmeh in September 2008. He won the 2008–09 Lebanese Premier League, and the 2009 Lebanese Super Cup after beating Ahed in the final. 

In 2010 he signed with Akhaa Ahli Aley, before returning to Sagesse in the Lebanese Second Division the following year. He signed for Racing Beirut in September 2012, scoring his first goal on 27 October in a 4–2 defeat to Ansar. On 1 June 2013, he scored a brace to secure the win against Tadamon Sour in the final game of the season, helping Racing Beirut reach third place in the league table for the first time in 40 years.

Rustom returned from retirement in March 2021, signing for Sagesse in the Second Division ahead of the second leg.

International career 
Rustom began his international career in 2003, playing in the qualifiers for the 2004 Summer Olympics.

Managerial career 
On 12 August 2020, Rustom was appointed assistant coach of the Lebanon national under-20 team.

Personal life 
Rustom is the son of the Lebanese football manager and former player Emile Rustom. He also has two siblings: Elie and Lawrence.

See also
 List of association football families

References

External links
 
 
 

1983 births
Living people
Footballers from Beirut
Lebanese footballers
Association football forwards
Sagesse SC footballers
Al Ansar FC players
Nejmeh SC players
Akhaa Ahli Aley FC players
Racing Club Beirut players
Lebanese Premier League players
Lebanese Second Division players
Lebanon youth international footballers
Lebanon international footballers
Association football coaches